Southpark Mall is a shopping mall serving the Tri-Cities, Virginia area, which itself is part of the much larger Richmond-Petersburg metropolitan area.

Mall description
It contains 76 stores and is anchored by Dick's Sporting Goods, Macy's (originally Thalhimers, later Hecht's), JCPenney, and Regal Cinemas. The mall is accessible from I-95 (Temple Avenue Exit 54 and Southpark Boulevard Exit 53) exits. The mall serves the Tri-Cities, Virginia area of the Greater Richmond Region.

History
Southpark Mall first opened in 1989. Five years later in 1994, Sam's Club opened in the mall's southeast outlot area. Dillard's closed in 2012. The store was originally Leggett and later Belk. The same year, renovations began on converting it to Dick's Sporting Goods and small shop space.

On November 2, 2017, it was announced that Sears, which had been at the mall since its opening in 1989, would be closing as part of a plan to close 63 stores nationwide. The store closed in January 2018.

References

External links
Southpark Mall

Shopping malls in Virginia
CBL Properties
Shopping malls established in 1989
1989 establishments in Virginia